Baeckea imbricata, commonly known as heath myrtle, is a species of flowering plant in the family Myrtaceae and is endemic to eastern Australia. It is a shrub with elliptical to egg-shaped or round leaves and small white flowers with five to twelve stamens.

Description 
There are five to twelve stamens in groups of up to three.

Taxonomy
Heath myrtle was first formally described in 1788 by Joseph Gaertner who gave it the name Jungia imbricata in De Fructibus et Seminibus Plantarum. In 1917, George Claridge Druce changed the name to Baeckea imbricata in the supplement to The Botanical Exchange Club and Society of the British Isles Report for 1916. The specific epithet (imbricata) means "overlapping".

Distribution and habitat
Baeckea imbricata grows in heathland in swampy places in near-coastal areas and on adjacent ranges from Cooloola National Park in south-eastern Queensland to Bawley Point in south-eastern New South Wales.

References

imbricata
Flora of New South Wales
Flora of Queensland
Plants described in 1788
Taxa named by Joseph Gaertner